The Theodore L. Marvel House is a historic house located at 188 Berkley Street in  Taunton, Massachusetts. It was built in 1883 in a shingle style and was added to the National Register of Historic Places in 1984.

The irregularly-shaped house features a hipped gable roof and varied wall surface of fieldstone and shingles. Among its most dominant elements are its boldly-arched fieldstone porch, varied fenestration, and connected Shingle Style barn, with sweeping roof, eyebrow windows and large arched entrance, constructed of fieldstone. It is sited on a large landscaped estate.

See also
National Register of Historic Places listings in Taunton, Massachusetts

References

National Register of Historic Places in Taunton, Massachusetts
Houses in Taunton, Massachusetts
Houses on the National Register of Historic Places in Bristol County, Massachusetts